In graph theory, the Hadwiger number of an undirected graph  is the size of the largest complete graph that can be obtained by contracting edges of .
It is named after Hugo Hadwiger, who introduced it in 1943 in conjunction with the Hadwiger conjecture, which states that the Hadwiger number is always at least as large as the chromatic number of .

The graphs with any finite bound on the Hadwiger number are sparse, and have small chromatic number. Determining the Hadwiger number of a graph is NP-hard but fixed-parameter tractable.

Graphs with small Hadwiger number

A graph  has Hadwiger number at most two if and only if it is a forest, for a three-vertex complete minor can only be formed by contracting a cycle in .

A graph has Hadwiger number at most three if and only if its treewidth is at most two, which is true if and only if each of its biconnected components is a series–parallel graph.

Wagner's theorem, which characterizes the planar graphs by their forbidden minors, implies that the planar graphs have Hadwiger number at most four. In the same paper that proved this theorem,  also characterized the graphs with Hadwiger number at most four more precisely: they are graphs that can be formed by clique-sum operations that combine planar graphs with the eight-vertex Wagner graph.

The graphs with Hadwiger number at most five include the apex graphs and the linklessly embeddable graphs, both of which have the complete graph  among their forbidden minors.

Sparsity
Every graph with  vertices and Hadwiger number  has  edges. This bound is tight: for every , there exist graphs with Hadwiger number  that have  edges. If a graph  has Hadwiger number , then all of its subgraphs also have Hadwiger number at most , and it follows that  must have degeneracy . Therefore, the graphs with bounded Hadwiger number are sparse graphs.

Coloring
The Hadwiger conjecture states that the Hadwiger number is always at least as large as the chromatic number of . That is, every graph with Hadwiger number  should have a graph coloring with at most  colors.

Because of their low degeneracy, the graphs with Hadwiger number at most  can be colored by a greedy coloring algorithm using  colors.

Computational complexity
Testing whether the Hadwiger number of a given graph is at least a given value  is NP-complete, from which it follows that determining the Hadwiger number is NP-hard. Additionally, polynomial time algorithms can approximate the Hadwiger number significantly more accurately than the best polynomial-time approximation (assuming P ≠ NP) to the size of the largest complete subgraph.

Related concepts

Uncountable clique minors in infinite graphs may be characterized in terms of havens, which formalize the evasion strategies for certain pursuit–evasion games: if the Hadwiger number is uncountable, then it equals the largest order of a haven in the graph.

Every graph with Hadwiger number  has at most  cliques (complete subgraphs).

 defines a class of graph parameters that he calls -functions, which include the Hadwiger number. These functions from graphs to integers are required to be zero on graphs with no edges, to be minor-monotone, to increase by one when a new vertex is added that is adjacent to all previous vertices, and to take the larger value from the two subgraphs on either side of a clique separator. The set of all such functions forms a complete lattice under the operations of elementwise minimization and maximization. The bottom element in this lattice is the Hadwiger number, and the top element is the treewidth.

Footnotes

Notes

References

.
.
.
.
.
.
.
.
.
.
.
.

Graph invariants
Graph minor theory